The Book of Magecraft is an accessory for the 2nd edition of the Advanced Dungeons & Dragons fantasy role-playing game, published in 1996.

Contents
The Book of Magecraft covers the magic using classes of the Birthright setting for AD&D: the magician class, who are specialists in divination and illusion magic who can only cast low-level spells of other types, and the wizard, who must be blooded but is otherwise like a normal AD&D magic user. The book also deals with War Magic, an area of spellcasting unique to Birthright which uses War Cards in large-scale battles; the book details the creation of War Magic versions of existing spells. The book also presents Realm Magic, which results from the magical energy which permeates the land of Cerilia and collects in pockets known as sources, which a regent wizard can cultivate. The Book of Magecraft also covers rules for finding, using, and borrowing source and ley lines, which a wizard can create and maintain to tap energy from non-adjacent sources. The book describes the magician character class, and provides associate character kits. Additionally, the book includes a set of Realm, Battle, and ordinary spells designed specifically for use with Birthright, and also includes  the Royal College of Sorcery, a list of Birthright-specific magic items and artifacts, and a description of a group of legendary creatures that are said to grant boons to wizards.

Publication history
The Book of Magecraft was published by TSR, Inc. in 1996.

Reception
Cliff Ramshaw reviewed The Book of Magecraft for Arcane magazine, rating it a 7 out of 10 overall. He comments on the War Spells: "Given the power of these spells, you can see why the rules emphasise the rarity of true wizards. Although casting fireballs willy nilly into a battlefield is great fun, it's a little unbalanced – a fighter of a similar level couldn't have as significant an effect." He calls the new spells in the book "varied and imaginative", the Royal College of Sorcery "intriguing", and the legendary creatures "seemingly tagged-on". Ramshaw concludes the review by stating: "It's a fairly solid accessory, though perhaps not as inspiring as it could be. Ordinary magic users will profit from its good selection of spells, while regent wizards will find it almost indispensable."

Reviews
Dragon #233

References

Birthright (campaign setting) supplements
Role-playing game supplements introduced in 1996